The 2017 World Ringette Championships (2017 WRC) was an international ringette tournament and the 12th (XII) of the World Ringette Championships. The tournament was organized by the International Ringette Federation (IRF) and was contested in Mississauga, Ontario, Canada, from November 27 – December 3, 2017, at the Hershey Centre Arena, now renamed the Paramount Fine Foods Centre. Eight of the games were live-streamed online and made available for public viewing.

Overview
Participating national teams in the included: Team Canada Senior, Team Canada Junior (U19), Team Finland Senior, Team Finland Junior (U19), Team Sweden Senior, Team USA Senior, Team Czech Republic Senior, and Team Slovakia Senior.

Team Finland Senior won the gold medal in the Senior Pool,  the "Sam Jacks Series", and Team Canada Junior won the gold medal in the Junior Pool. In the President's Pool, Sweden claimed gold, the USA claimed silver, and the Czech Republic claimed the bronze.

Venue

Teams

Final standings

Senior Pool results 

The Senior Pool competition, also known as the "Sam Jacks Series", was a three-game series between Team Canada Senior and Team Finland Senior. Team Finland Senior won the gold medal and the Sam Jacks Trophy.

Junior Pool results 
The Junior Pool competition was a three-game series between Team Canada Junior and Team Finland Junior.

President's Pool results 
The President's Pool involved junior (U19) athletes from Team Canada Junior and Team Finland Junior competing with the developing ringette countries. The winning team was rewarded with a gold medal and the President's Trophy.

Rosters

Seniors

Team Finland Senior
The 2017 Team Finland Senior team included the following:

Team Canada Senior
The 2017 Team Canada Senior team competed in the 2017 World Ringette Championships. The 2017 Team Canada Senior team included the following:

Juniors

Team Finland Junior

The 2017 Team Finland Junior team included the following:

Team Canada Junior
The 2017 Team Canada Junior team included the following:

President's Pool

Team Sweden Senior
The 2017 Sweden Senior team included the following:

Team USA Senior
The 2017 USA Senior team included the following:

Team Czech Republic Senior
The 2017 Czech Republic Senior team included the following:

See also
 World Ringette Championships
 International Ringette Federation
  Canada national ringette team
  Finland national ringette team
  Sweden national ringette team
  United States national ringette team
  Czech Republic national ringette team

References

Ringette
Ringette competitions
World Ringette Championships
World Ringette Championships
World Ringette Championships
International sports competitions hosted by Canada
2010s in Ontario
World Ringette Championships
World Ringette Championships
Sport in Ontario